Antarctica has no permanent residents. It contains research stations and field camps that are staffed seasonally or year-round, and former whaling settlements. Approximately 12 nations, all signatory to the Antarctic Treaty, send personnel to perform seasonal (summer) or year-round research on the continent and in its surrounding oceans.

The population of people doing and supporting scientific research on the continent and its nearby islands south of 60 degrees south latitude (the region covered by the Antarctic Treaty) varies from approximately 4,000 in summer to 1,000 in winter. In addition, approximately 1,000 personnel including ship's crew and scientists doing onboard research are present in the waters of the treaty region. The largest station, McMurdo Station, has a summer population of about 1,000 people and a winter population of about 200. 

At least 11 children have been born in Antarctica. The first was Emilio Marcos Palma, born on 7 January 1978 to Argentine parents at Esperanza, Hope Bay, near the tip of the Antarctic peninsula. The first girl born on the Antarctic continent was Marisa De Las Nieves Delgado, born on May 27, 1978. The birth occurred at Fortín Sargento Cabral, Base Esperanza (Argentine Army).

See also

Brazilian Antarctica
Villa Las Estrellas
Argentine Antarctica
Research stations in Antarctica
List of Antarctic field camps
List of Antarctic expeditions
Colonization of Antarctica
Religion in Antarctica
Crime in Antarctica

References

External links
 Antarctica at the CIA World Factbook (includes section on the population of Antarctica).

People of Antarctica
Antarctica